The 2005 Portland Grand Prix was the sixth race for the 2005 American Le Mans Series season held at Portland International Raceway.  It took place on July 30, 2005.

Official results

Class winners in bold.  Cars failing to complete 70% of winner's distance marked as Not Classified (NC).

Statistics
 Pole Position - #20 Dyson Racing - 1:02.712
 Fastest Lap - #20 Dyson Racing - 1:04.271
 Distance - 
 Average Speed -

External links
 

P
Portland Grand Prix
Port
Portland Grand Prix